Jaunpur Lok Sabha Constituency is a parliamentary constituency in Uttar Pradesh.

Assembly Segments

Members of Parliament

^ by poll

Election results

See also
 Jaunpur district
 List of Constituencies of the Lok Sabha

Lok Sabha constituencies in Uttar Pradesh
Politics of Jaunpur district